Aldag is a surname. Notable people with the surname include:

Bill Aldag (1905–1974), Australian rules footballer
John Aldag (born 1963), Canadian politician
Peter Aldag (born 1965), German sailor
Roger Aldag (born 1953), Canadian football player
Rolf Aldag (born 1968), German cyclist
Edward K Aldag, Jr (born 1963), American Businessman, founder of Medical Properties Trust, Inc.,